Dorval railway station may refer to either train station in Dorval:
 Dorval station (RTM), the commuter station
 Dorval station (Via Rail), the long-distance station